Crossout is a free-to-play vehicular combat video game focused on building and driving custom vehicles in PvP and PvE scenarios. It is developed by Targem Games and published by Gaijin Entertainment for Android, IOS, Windows, PlayStation 4, Xbox One and Xbox Series X/S. As of 2021, PlayPark, a part of AsiaSoft acquired the game's server of Asian territories.

Gameplay 
The gameplay is about assembling vehicles with different parts, weapons, and modules awarded throughout the game or bought through the in-game store (via microtransactions) or market (via in-game currency). The player can drive their own custom vehicle in multiplayer gamemodes in PvP battles, or against AI opponents in PvE modes. The cars are fully destructible, weapons, armor and wheels can be knocked off, reducing the capabilities of the vehicle.

The player starts the game inside of their garage, which acts as a main menu where they can choose game modes, access their own vehicles, browse the in-game shop and market, try out vehicles shared by the community, and check on their general progress with the game. They can also head outside into the range to drive around and shoot targets for practice.

Vehicles are built out of hardware (functional parts such as weapons, cabins, wheels), structural parts (armor), frames, and decorations. The frames form the chassis of the vehicle; the cabin, which also has a built-in engine, provides power and energy for modules and weapons; weapons deal damage and modules provide additional capabilities, such as faster reloading, bonus engine power, stealth, radar, etc. Armor shields and connects other parts, and most armor parts increase the health of the vehicle. Decorations provide an experience bonus. Movement parts include wheels, tracks, augers, legs, hovers (downward pointing jet engines that allow the vehicle to hover at low altitude) that allow movement with varying speed and agility.

Cabins have tonnage and power limits, and adding movement parts increases tonnage (up to a mass limit). Each vehicle has a cabin durability value, a sum of cabin base health and armor part health, which is decreased every time the cabin is damaged or armor parts are destroyed. Some armor parts do not increase durability when added and also do not decrease it when destroyed. The vehicle is destroyed when its cabin is destroyed (cabin durability drops to 0).

The vehicles are divided into archetypes: light, medium and heavy, usually based on their cabin type. Light vehicles rely on speed and agility to avoid and deal damage, while heavy ones can afford to place a lot of heavy armor and rely on being able to take damage. Medium vehicles sit in between these types. Weapons are divided into melee (contact and ramming), short-range, medium-range and long-range, but some do not belong to these categories (like landmine and trap layers). Some weapons and hardware are entirely fictional, and some are real designs, modified to survive in combat. For example, the Jawbreaker cabin is the cabin from a BAE SEP APC, and structural parts and wheels from this vehicle are also available; the Whirlwind autocannon is a Bushmaster cannon in a Mk 38 mount. Other notable vehicles appearing in the game (usually in a form of a cabin and sometimes fitting armor parts) include Ford F-150 (7th gen), GAZelle, MAZ-7310, Volkswagen Type 2, etc. The weapons are often based on Soviet, American and European equipment.

The players can build a custom vehicle fitting their playstyle, with any weapons on any chassis, and tweak and upgrade it as they test it in battles and obtain better equipment. Blueprints allow to save vehicles for later use, and some example blueprints are provided by factions. Each faction will usually cater towards a particular vehicle archetype and playstyle, but the player is free to combine hardware form all factions in their designs.

Some parts have perks - special abilities that grant a passive, event-activated or player-activated bonus (for example, a cabin can provide bonus power when receiving damage, a weapon can deal more damage if at least 2 enemies are nearby, etc.) Creating a synergy of perks is important to create an efficient vehicle. Some cabins or modules will have perks that are favourable for a particular playstyle or weapon.

Vehicles have a PS (Powerscore) stat which is a sum of the powerscore values of all of its parts. More advanced parts have generally higher PS, and higher PS vehicles will encounter more difficult enemies in most modes. High-PS vehicles also can earn more expensive resources in battles.

Progression involves obtaining better equipment, which can be done in multiple ways:

 Buying equipment in store or on the market
 Crafting equipment using earned resources
 Obtaining equipment as a reward for leveling up standing with factions and achieving Battle Pass levels

Battles reward players with experience points, which count towards their faction progress and resources, which can be used for crafting or sold. Additional rewards are earned by completing regular quests.

The Market is an in-game platform for item exchange between players. Anyone can put a buy or sell order for hardware or resources, and other players can buy or sell according to these orders or put their own orders. Therefore, the prices are affected by player actions, though there is a limit on prices ("corridor") that prevents players from setting outstandingly high or low prices. These are adjusted dynamically. Prices can fluctuate due to in-game events, like on a real stock market, and players can even try to earn a profit on these fluctuations. Coins or Gold is the in-game currency used on the Market. It can also be bought as microtransactions and earned during events. When player sells a part, they receive an amount of coins the buyer spent minus market tax.

Game modes 
PvP game modes includes:

 8 vs 8 Assault.  With bases at each opposite ends of the map. One team must eliminate their opponents or capture the enemy base to win.
 8 vs 8 Domination.  With three bases placed on the map. One team must eliminate their opponents or capture two out of the three bases to win the match.
 8 vs 8 Encounter.  With one base placed on the center of the map. One team must eliminate their opponents or capture the base to win the match.

PvE Raids against bandits for 4 players:

A group of players cooperate to complete certain objectives inside of a map, fighting AI-controlled enemies and facing bosses with unique weapons. Players need Fuel, a resource collected in the game and given for free each day, to be able to participate in Raids.

Adventure mode or Awakening, a single-player/optional co-op campaign:

A story mode. The player plays as an unnamed protagonist who awakes in the Blood Rocks, their memory lost. They have to progress through the story by completing sequential missions involving combat, deliveries, scouting, meeting NPC's, etc. The story revolves around the protagonist trying to resolve what caused their memory loss and to adapt in the new world by working for the different factions and learning about the world from the characters. The mode also can serve as a sandbox/free roaming mode: even after the main story is complete the player can play through it again, participate in side missions, some of which can be done in co-op, or simply fight randomly-spawning enemies and collect drops. Up to 4 players can persist in an Adventure game at a time. The threats in this mode are adjusted according to player's vehicle strength.

Player Brawls, which are available on a set schedule:

 32-player Battle Royale (every weekend):

Last driver standing wins, players spawn inside of a large map with a small vehicle and a single frontal melee weapon. Survivors must equip themselves with equipment, weapons and armor scattered around. The play area progressively gets smaller as a sandstorm closes in, damaging any vehicle caught in it.

 16-player Bedlam (always available)

A free-for-all game mode with no objectives or rules, players are free to join and leave at any time. You can battle other players, drive around, or simply socialize.

 8-player Big Bad Scorpions (Mondays from 12AM-8AM, 4PM-12PM, Wednesdays from 4PM-12PM and Thursdays from 8AM-4PM UTC)

A free-for-all arena mode, players are equipped with a small vehicle and a railgun, it takes exactly one shot to destroy an opponent. The player with the most eliminations when the timer ends wins.

 8-player Storm Warning (Tuesdays from 12AM-8AM, 4PM-12PM, Wednesdays at 8AM-4PM and Thursdays from 12AM-8AM UTC)

The last driver standing wins, players spawn with their own built vehicle. The play area progressively gets smaller as a sandstorm approaches, damaging any vehicle in it.

 8-player Race (Tuesdays from 8AM-4PM, Fridays from 12AM-8AM and 4PM-12PM UTC)

Players must race through checkpoints while avoiding obstacles, first place wins. Weapons are disabled in this game mode.

Other brawls may be available in limited events, like the Brawl Festival or Steel Championship (yearly football-themed event).

Players are awarded different resources for participating in matches, which they can use to build more weapons and parts, or to trade for in-game currency via the market. Some brawls (like Race) award lootboxes.

Development 

On May 20, 2015, both Gaijin Entertainment and Targem Games announced the  development of a new free-to-play mmo set in a post-apocalyptic future. The first alpha tests of the game, called 'Battle Test', were launched in summer 2015. and in the same year, the game made its debut on the E3 2015. Later in the same year, the game was playable in a closed area at Gaijin Entertainment's booth at Gamescom 2015, where players got a promo code to participate in further testing. On April 5, 2016, Crossout went into closed beta and was launched into open beta on May 30, 2017, on PC, PlayStation 4 and Xbox One. On February 10, 2022, Crossout Mobile was launched on the Apple App Store, six days after the Google Play Store launch.

Reception 
MMORPG.com called Crossout “The most innovative game at E3 2015”.

See also 
Autoduel

References

External links 
Official website
Gaijin Entertainment website
Targem Games website

Action video games
Free-to-play video games
Multiplayer video games
PlayStation 4 games
2017 video games
Vehicular combat games
Video games developed in Russia
Windows games
Xbox One games
Gaijin Entertainment games
Targem Games games